Hemerocallis dumortieri is a species of plant in the family Asphodelaceae. It is native to Korea and possibly parts of China, and has been introduced into Japan. Hemerocallis dumortieri var. esculenta is native to Hokkaidō.

References

dumortieri
Flora of Korea
Plants described in 1932